Grantstand is an album by American jazz guitarist Grant Green featuring performances recorded in 1961 and released on the Blue Note label in 1962. Green is heard in a quartet with saxophonist Yusef Lateef, organist Jack McDuff, and drummer Al Harewood. The CD reissue released in 1987 features one bonus track from the same session.

Reception

The Allmusic review by Steve Huey awarded the album 4 stars and stated "if you're looking for Green the soul-jazz groovemaster, Grantstand is an excellent place to find him".

Track listing
All compositions by Grant Green except as indicated

 "Grantstand" – 9:03
 "My Funny Valentine" (Lorenz Hart, Richard Rodgers) – 9:06
 "Blues in Maude's Flat" – 15:00
 "Old Folks" (Dedette Lee Hill, Willard Robison) – 4:11
 "Green's Greenery" – 5:10 [Bonus track on CD reissue]

Personnel
Grant Green – guitar
Yusef Lateef – tenor saxophone (except track 4), flute (track 2)
Brother Jack McDuff – organ
Al Harewood – drums

References 

Grant Green albums
1962 albums
Albums produced by Alfred Lion
Albums recorded at Van Gelder Studio
Blue Note Records albums